Abbakumovskaya is a rural locality (a village) in Tarnogsky District, Vologda Oblast, Russia. The population was 97 as of 2002.

Geography 
Abbakumovskaya is located 15 km northeast of Tarnogsky Gorodok (the district's administrative centre) by road. Kirivanovskaya is the nearest rural locality.

Ethnicity 
The village is inhabited by Russians and others.

References 

Rural localities in Tarnogsky District